Vitali Tsypko (born in Dnipropetrovsk, Ukrainian SSR, Soviet Union) is a Ukrainian professional boxer who fights in the super middleweight division.

References

External links
 

1976 births
Living people
Ukrainian male boxers
Super-middleweight boxers
Sportspeople from Dnipro